Dardo was one of four s built for the  (Royal Italian Navy) in the early 1930s. Completed in 1932, she served in World War II. The ship was captured by the Germans after the Italian armistice in September 1943 and used by the  under the name TA31 until she was sunk in April 1945.

Design and description
The Freccia-class destroyers were enlarged and improved versions of the preceding . Their complement during wartime was 185 officers and enlisted men.

The Freccias were powered by two Parsons geared steam turbines, each driving one propeller shaft using steam supplied by three Thornycroft boilers.

Their main battery consisted of four  guns in two twin-gun turrets, one each fore and aft of the superstructure. Anti-aircraft (AA) defense for the Freccia-class ships was provided by a pair of  AA guns in single mounts amidships and a pair of twin-gun mounts for  machine guns. They were equipped with six  torpedo tubes in two triple mounts amidships. Although the ships were not provided with a sonar system for anti-submarine work, they were fitted with a pair of depth charge throwers. The Freccias could carry 54 mines.

Construction and career
Dardo was laid down by Cantieri navali Odero at their Genoa-Sestri Ponente shipyard on 23 January 1929, launched on 6 September 1930 and commissioned on 21 January 1932.

Citations

Bibliography

External links
 Dardo (1930)  Marina Militare website

Freccia-class destroyers
Ships built in Genoa
1930 ships
World War II destroyers of Italy
Maritime incidents in April 1945